César Leonardo Monasterio (born July 10, 1971 in San Miguel de Tucumán) is an Argentine retired football goalkeeper and current manager.

Career
Monasterio started his playing career in 1993 with Deportivo Morón. Between 1995 and 1998 he played in the Argentine Primera with Platense.

In 1998, he moved down a division to play for Brown de Arrecifes and then Independiente Rivadavia. In 2000-2001 he had a spell in Bolivia with Oriente Petrolero before returning to Argentina to play for San Martín de San Juan, in 2007 the club secured promotion to the Argentine Primera. After seven years and over 200 appearances for San Martín, Monasterio joined Club Atlético Estudiantes from Caseros, Buenos Aires in 2008.

Managerial career
After retiring, Monasterio stayed in football, working in the technical staff of Nueva Chicago and later also Barracas Central. In June 2019, he was appointed manager of his former club, Deportivo Laferrere.

References

External links
 César Leonardo Monasterio - Argentine Primera statistics at Fútbol XXI  
 César Monasterio at BDFA.com.ar 
 César Monasterio at Football-Lineups

1971 births
Living people
Sportspeople from San Miguel de Tucumán
Argentine footballers
Association football goalkeepers
Club Atlético Platense footballers
Independiente Rivadavia footballers
Oriente Petrolero players
Expatriate footballers in Bolivia
San Martín de San Juan footballers
Estudiantes de Buenos Aires footballers
Deportivo Morón footballers
Club Almirante Brown footballers
Deportivo Laferrere footballers
Argentine expatriate sportspeople in Bolivia
Argentine football managers